The 1979 WCT World Doubles, also known by its sponsored name Braniff Airways World Doubles Championship, was a men's tennis tournament played on indoor carpet courts at Olympia in London, England that was part of the 1979 Colgate-Palmolive Grand Prix. It was the tour finals for the doubles season of the WCT Tour section. The tournament was held from January 3 through January 7, 1979.

Final

Doubles
 Peter Fleming /  John McEnroe defeated  Ilie Năstase /  Sherwood Stewart 3–6, 6–2, 6–3, 6–1

References

WCT World Doubles
World Championship Tennis World Doubles